Ken Skupski and Neal Skupski were the defending champions, but decided not to defend their title. Third seeds Saketh Myneni and Divij Sharan won the title defeating Malek Jaziri and Denys Molchanov 7–6(7–5), 4–6, 0–0 retired in the final.

Seeds

Draw

References
 Main Draw

Turk Telecom Izmir Cup - Doubles
Doubles